Weather the Lizard was a nautical term used commonly in the 18th century Royal Navy and referred to making sail from either Plymouth or Portsmouth and setting sail by Cornwall Peninsula (referred to as "the Lizard") with the land on the starboard side of the ship.

In the television adaptation of "Horatio Hornblower", an order is given to weather the lizard in the episode Hornblower:Mutiny.

References

 Croix, P.D. (2003). Patrick O'Brian's Navy. London: Salamander Books.

Nautical terminology
Lizard Peninsula